Lauterecken is a former Verbandsgemeinde ("collective municipality") in the district of Kusel, Rhineland-Palatinate, Germany. The seat of the Verbandsgemeinde was in Lauterecken. On 1 July 2014 it merged into the new Verbandsgemeinde Lauterecken-Wolfstein.

The Verbandsgemeinde Lauterecken consisted of the following Ortsgemeinden ("local municipalities"):

External links
Official website

Former Verbandsgemeinden in Rhineland-Palatinate